Erman Eltemur (born May 11, 1993) is a Turkish karateka competing in the kumite −75 kg division. Born in Gölcük, Kocaeli province, he resides in Istanbul, where he is a member of İstanbul Büyükşehir Belediyesi S.K.

Achievements

2014
 European Championships – 4 May, Tampere, FIN – Team kumite,
 World Championships – 9 November, Bremen, GER – Team kumite,

2015
 European Games – 13 June, Baku, AZE – kumite 75 kg,

2016
 European Championships – 7 May, Montpellier, FRA – kumite 75 kg,

2017
  European Championships – 6 May, İzmit, TUR – kumite 67 kg,

References

External links

Erman Eltemur at Turkish Karate Federation website

Living people
1993 births
People from Gölcük
Turkish male karateka
Istanbul Büyükşehir Belediyespor athletes
Karateka at the 2015 European Games
Karateka at the 2019 European Games
European Games medalists in karate
European Games bronze medalists for Turkey
Competitors at the 2018 Mediterranean Games
Mediterranean Games competitors for Turkey
Competitors at the 2022 Mediterranean Games
20th-century Turkish people
21st-century Turkish people